United States Coast Guard Air Station Clearwater (CGAS Clearwater) is the United States Coast Guard's largest air station. It is located at the St. Petersburg-Clearwater International Airport in Clearwater, Florida and is home to nearly 700 USCG aviation and support personnel. As of March 2021, there are ten MH-60T Jayhawk helicopters, four HC-130H Hercules aircraft assigned to CGAS Clearwater. Also on static display is USCG 1023, a restored Grumman HU-16 Albatross.

Air Station Clearwater also operates two aviation facilities in The Bahamas, one at Great Inagua and one at the United States Navy's Atlantic Undersea Test and Evaluation Center (AUTEC) installation at Andros Island. These facilities support continually deployed HH-60Js and MH-60Ts from various air stations for Operations Bahamas, Turks and Caicos (OPBAT), a joint U.S. Drug Enforcement Administration (DEA), U.S. Immigration and Customs Enforcement (ICE) and U.S. Coast Guard counter-narcotics (CN) and migrant smuggling interdiction operation.

History

In 1934, an air station was commissioned on the west coast of Florida at Albert Whitted Airport in downtown St. Petersburg.  Designated as Coast Guard Air Station St. Petersburg, it subsequently became a home base for various Coast Guard amphibious aircraft and helicopters. In 1976, the addition of four land-based HC-130 Hercules aircraft prompted the move to, and construction of, new facilities at St. Petersburg-Clearwater International Airport. With this move, the air station's name was changed to U.S. Coast Guard Air Station Clearwater.

CGAS Clearwater has a rich history, and its operations have been at the heart of significant events in Florida and the Caribbean for many years. In the early 1980s, its high operations tempo earned Clearwater two Coast Guard Meritorious Unit Commendations, the Humanitarian Service Medal, and the Coast Guard Unit Commendation. It was during this time that the Air Station provided crucial support to the surface fleet during the Cuban boat lift. Shortly thereafter Clearwater answered the call to duty during Operation Urgent Fury—the Grenada rescue mission, and was awarded the Armed Forces Expeditionary Medal for its support of the invasion as well as the Coast Guard Meritorious Unit Commendation for its continual support efforts. Later that same year another Coast Guard Meritorious Unit Commendation was awarded to the Air Station for its role in Operation Wagon Wheel, an international drug interdiction effort.

In 1986, following on the success of the previous operation, Clearwater conducted Operation Hunter. This drug interdiction effort planted the seeds for what is today's OPBAT (Operation Bahamas and Turks and Caicos). Perhaps the single most noteworthy mission for the Air Station also came in 1986, during the launch of the Space Shuttle Challenger. Air Station Clearwater crews responded immediately, the initial crew arriving on scene so quickly it had to stand off while the debris from the explosion continued to fall from the sky. In all, Air Station Clearwater flew 33 sorties on the Challenger mission and was awarded a Coast Guard Unit Commendation with Operational device.

CGAS Clearwater became the Coast Guard's largest air station in 1987 with the expansion of the drug interdiction mission, "Operations Bahamas, Turks, and Caicos" or OPBAT. This large ongoing mission resulted in the assignment of 12 HH-60J Jayhawk helicopters, the newest in the Coast Guard fleet, and boosted personnel strength to its current level of over 500 men and women. Also during this period, three additional HC-130s were stationed at Air Station Clearwater to support the increased law enforcement efforts. The air station's motto of "Anytime, Anywhere" accurately describes its pace of operations.

The 1990s were no less dramatic for the men and women of CGAS Clearwater. In 1991, the station's HC-130s responded rapidly to fly personnel and supplies in and out of the combat theater in support of Operation Desert Storm. During the Haitian uprising in 1992, CGAS Clearwater crews evacuated American embassy personnel and transported U.S. Special Forces into Haiti. When south Florida and Louisiana were devastated by Hurricane Andrew, CGAS Clearwater crews flew missions round the clock, transporting hundreds of tons of badly needed supplies. In March 1993, the "Storm of the Century" struck Florida leaving numerous sunken vessels in its wake. Air Station Clearwater crews launched at the height of the storm and pulled 62 people from the water in what was the busiest search and rescue day in the air station's history.  In the summer of 1994 air crews participated in a massive SAR effort which located and rescued 34,568 Cubans and 23,389 Haitian migrants from the waters of the Caribbean.

In 1997, the U.S. renewed its effort towards the War on Drugs, and Clearwater responded as part of Operations Frontier Shield, Gulf Shield, and Frontier Lance. Those operations were aimed at stemming the flow of illegal drugs and migrants and spanned from the Leeward Islands of the Caribbean to the southern coastline of Texas. The Coast Guard set new records for both drug seizures and arrests.
 Winner of the National Defense Transportation Award for 2000.
 Winner of Excellence in Food Services Award for 2001, 2002, 2004 and 2007.
In 2005, Air Station Clearwater crews helped support the survivors of the tsunami in the Indian Ocean. In 2006, the United States Navy Reserve vacated the former Navy Operational Support Center St. Petersburg/Clearwater (formerly Naval Reserve Center St. Petersburg/Clearwater) adjacent to the air station, transferring the facility to the Coast Guard and placing it under the oversight of Coast Guard Air Station Clearwater.

Current aircraft
The HC-130 first became a part of Air Station Clearwater in 1976. The Lockheed HC-130H model is the current version assigned, with 5 such aircraft in the air station's current inventory.  HC-130s from Air Station Clearwater have deployed worldwide including most of the contiguous 48 states, Alaska, Hawaii, throughout the Caribbean, Central America, South America, Europe, Asia, Africa, and Australia. The HC-130 Hercules performs numerous missions in support of Search and Rescue, Law Enforcement, Marine Environmental Protection, and logistics. The aircraft is an ideal platform for long range Search and Rescue, with over 14 hours of airborne endurance and large scanner windows built into the airframe side.

The 9 Sikorsky HH-60J Jayhawk helicopters previously assigned to the air station have since been replaced by 13 upgraded MH-60T Jayhawk versions. This aircraft has a long-range capability of 600 nautical miles (1100 km) to support Coast Guard cutters on Law Enforcement patrols, deliver dewatering pumps to sinking vessels, evacuate injured crew members from vessels far at sea, and many other missions. Air Station Clearwater helicopter aircrews fly an average of over 400 Search and Rescue cases each year along both the east and west coasts of Florida, the Bahamas, and beyond.

References

External links

  CGAS Clearwater official website

United States Coast Guard Air Stations
United States Coast Guard Aviation
Buildings and structures in Pinellas County, Florida
Military installations in Florida
1934 establishments in Florida
Military installations established in 1934